= Felix Oragwu =

Nigerian physicist and science and technology administrator

Felix N. C. Oragwu is a Nigerian physicist and science and technology administrator. He was a lecturer in physics at the University of Nigeria, Nsukka, before the Nigerian Civil War (1967–1970). During the war, he was involved in the scientific and technological activities of the Republic of Biafra's Research and Production (RAP) organisation, which developed equipment and weapons for the Biafran armed forces.

After the war, Oragwu worked in Nigeria's science and technology sector, including the National Science and Technology Development Agency. He also contributed to international science and technology policy initiatives and authored publications on technological development and industrialisation.

== Education and early career ==
Oragwu studied physics at the University of Glasgow in Scotland, graduating in 1960. He subsequently pursued further studies in Canada and the United Kingdom.

He returned to Nigeria and joined the University of Nigeria, Nsukka, as a physics lecturer. His academic career was interrupted by the outbreak of the Nigerian Civil War in 1967.

== Nigerian Civil War ==
During the Nigerian Civil War, Oragwu participated in the scientific and technological activities organised by the Biafran government. The programme was initially associated with the Science Group and subsequently developed into the Research and Production (RAP) organisation.

RAP brought together scientists, engineers, technicians and other specialists to develop locally manufactured equipment and military supplies in response to the blockade imposed on Biafra during the war.

Oragwu was involved in research planning and the coordination of technological services within the organisation. The work of RAP included the development of the Ogbunigwe, a locally manufactured weapon system used by Biafran forces.

In a 2017 interview with The Sun, Oragwu discussed the group's efforts to manufacture weapons and develop industrial facilities during the war.

== Science and technology administration ==
Following the end of the war in 1970, Oragwu continued his career in science and technology administration in Nigeria.

A 1978 United States government scientific and technical report listed F. N. C. Oragwu as Director of Technology and Industrial Sciences in the Research Department of Nigeria's National Science and Technology Development Agency.

The United Nations records identify Felix N. C. Oragwu of Nigeria as chairman of the Intergovernmental Committee on Science and Technology for Development for 1987.

Oragwu was also associated with efforts to develop Nigeria's indigenous technological and industrial research capabilities. His work has been discussed in connection with the establishment and development of national research and technology institutions.

== Publications ==
Oragwu has written on science, technology, industrial development and the history of technological innovation in Nigeria.

His known publications include:

- Scientific and Technological Innovations in Biafra: The Ogbunigwe Fame, 1967–1970 (2010).
- Technology and Wealth of Nations (2021).
- A Science and Technology Profile of St. Lucia (1990), published by the Commonwealth Science Council in London.

He also contributed a chapter titled "Scientific and Technological Aspects of the War-Machine in Biafra" to Nigeria Since Independence: The First Twenty-Five Years, Volume VI: The Civil War Years (1989).
